Sir Norman Myer (25 May 1897 – 17 December 1956) was an Australian businessman best known for his role in the development of the Myer department store.

Early life
Myer was born Nahum Moshe Baevski in 1897 in Tatarsk Smolensk, Russia. He studied at Ashwick School (run by C. H. Nash) and Wesley College. He enlisted in the Australian Imperial Force in 1916 and served on the Western Front from August 1917 as a driver with the 1st Divisional Ammunition Column. He became a lieutenant in April 1919.

Honours
Myer was made a knight bachelor in May 1956 for services to philanthropy in Victoria.

References

1897 births
1956 deaths
Emigrants from the Russian Empire to Australia
Australian Jews
Australian people of Belarusian-Jewish descent
Australian Knights Bachelor
20th-century Australian businesspeople
People educated at Wesley College (Victoria)
Australian military personnel of World War I
Myer family